Neufchâtel (Norman: Neu(f)câtel) is a soft, slightly crumbly, mold-ripened, bloomy-rind cheese made in the Neufchâtel-en-Bray region of Normandy. One of the oldest kinds of cheese in France, its production is believed to date back as far as the 6th century AD, in the Kingdom of the Franks. It looks similar to Camembert and Brie, with a dry, white, edible rind, but the taste is saltier and sharper. Unlike other soft-white-rinded cheeses, Neufchâtel has a grainy texture. It is usually sold in heart shapes but is also produced in other forms, such as logs and boxes.

This AOC product should not be confused with the American version of the cheese, which is a factory manufactured lower fat, higher moisture content, unaged alternative to American cream cheese.

History 
Neufchâtel is the oldest of the Norman cheeses, having likely been made as early as the 6th century, and known to have been made between 1050 to 1543. For the end-of-year festivals during the Hundred Years' War, stories say that young girls offered heart-shaped cheeses to English soldiers to show their affection. During the 17th century it was sent to Paris and Rouen, and exported to Great Britain. 

In 1880 Isidore Lefebvre, a farmer, constructed a dairy in Nesle-Hodeng, where he could mould and ripen cheese curds made by farmers in the surrounding area. Among Lefebvre's distributors were stores such as Harrods. 

A quality label was granted for Neufchâtel from 1949 to 1953. In 1957 the agricultural assembly of the Neufchâtel district created a federation for protecting the quality of the cheese, working to demand an appellation d'origine contrôlée (AOC, "controlled designation of origin"). This was put into law May 3rd, 1969, and modified December 29th, 1986. The AOC was reviewed again in 2006 under higher scrutiny, requiring that 65% of a manufacturer's cows be of the Normande breed. 

Production of the cheese decreased after World War II. In 1993 there were 31 farms and one factory producing 45% of all Neufchâtel.

Shapes 
There are six different shapes of Neufchâtel:

 Carré (square-shaped), (100 g)
 Briquette (brick-shaped), (100 g)
 Bondon or bonde (bung or plug-shaped), (100 g)
 Cœur (heart-shaped), (200 g)
 Double bonde (double plug-shaped, twice the weight of a bondon), (200 g)
 Grand cœur or gros cœur (large heart-shaped, thrice the weight of a cœur), (600 g)

American "Neufchâtel"
In 1872, William Lawrence, a New York dairyman of the township of Chester, created the first American cream cheese as the result of adding cream to a traditional recipe for Neufchâtel. 

American "Neufchâtel" is softer than regular cream cheese due to its approximately ~33% lower fat and higher moisture content. Due to this reduced fat content, it is found in most grocery stores as a reduced-fat alternative to cream cheese.

See also
 List of cheeses

References

External links

French cheeses
French products with protected designation of origin
Cow's-milk cheeses
Norman cuisine